Fortunale has been borne by at least two ships of the Italian Navy and may refer to:

 , previously the Norwegian fishing boat Lionell Jacobsen purchased by Italy in 1916 and renamed. She was discarded in 1919.
 , a  launched in 1942 and transferred to Russia under the designation Z 17 in 1949.

Italian Navy ship names